Perico Sambeat (born July 13, 1962) is a Spanish jazz saxophonist.
He is an instructor at Berklee's campus in Valencia, Spain.

Discography
 Uptown Dance (EGT, 1992)
 Dual Force (Ronnie Scott's Jazz House, 1996)
 Jindungo (Fresh Sound, 1997)
 Ademuz (Fresh Sound, 1998)
 Some Other Spring (Satchmo, 1999)
 Perico (Lola/Chrysalis/EMI Spain, 2001)
 Jazz Viene Del Sur Cruce de Caminos (Resistencia, 2001)
 Passages (Resistencia, 2002)
 Friendship (ACT, 2003)
 Un Circ Sense Ileons (Nuevos Medios, 2004)
 Colina Miralta Sambeat Trio (Contrabaix/Karonte, 2007)
 Flamenco Big Band (Verve, 2008)
 Andando (Contrabaix, 2009)
 Infinita (Fresh Sound, 2009)
 Barcelona Hora Cero (Ayva, 2010)
 Baladas (Contrabaix, 2011)
 Sketches of Pangea (Budapest Music Center, 2011)
 Elastic (Karonte/(Contrabaix, 2012)
 Plays Zappa (Karonte, 2016)
 Ofrenda (Karonte 2019)

References

External links
Faculty page

1962 births
Spanish saxophonists
Living people
21st-century saxophonists
ACT Music artists
Fresh Sounds Records artists